Flight Path is the second album by the group the Sphere featuring saxophonist Charlie Rouse, pianist Kenny Barron, bassist Buster Williams, and drummer Ben Riley that was recorded in 1983 and released on the Elektra/Musician label.

Reception 

In his review on AllMusic, Ken Dryden states: "All of the group's members are in top form, with drummer Ben Riley (like Rouse, a veteran of Monk's quartet) solidly anchoring the rhythm section".

Track listing 
 "If I Should Lose You" (Ralph Rainger, Leo Robin) – 10:31
 "Pumpkin's Delight" (Charlie Rouse) – 6:40
 "Played Twice" (Thelonious Monk) – 4:30
 "El Sueño" (Kenny Barron) – 5:27
 "Christina" (Buster Williams) – 4:47
 "Flight Path" (Barron) – 4:45

Personnel 
Charlie Rouse – tenor saxophone
Kenny Barron – piano
Buster Williams – bass
Ben Riley – drum

References 

Sphere (American band) albums
1983 albums
Elektra/Musician albums
Albums recorded at Van Gelder Studio